The 2022–23 FC Voluntari season is the club's 13th season in existence and the seventh consecutive season in the top flight of Romanian football. In addition to the domestic league, Voluntari are participating in this season's edition of the Cupa României.

Players

Out on loan

Pre-season and friendlies

Competitions

Overview

Liga I

League table

Results summary

Results by round

Matches 
The league fixtures were announced on 1 July 2022.

Cupa României

References 

FC Voluntari seasons
FC Voluntari